Rex v. Dixon, 3 M. & S. 11 (K.B. 1814), was a case decided by the King's Bench that held that a person could not be convicted of selling impure foods unless he knew of the impurities.

Subsequent history
The case was later overruled in Regina v. Woodrow, which abolished the mens rea requirement of Rex v. Dixon.

References

D
1814 in case law
1814 in England
Food safety scandals
Food safety in the United Kingdom
1814 in British law
Court of King's Bench (England) cases